The 2010 Women's Baseball World Cup was an international baseball competition that was held in Venezuela from August 12 to August 22, 2010. Japan successfully defended their title from 2008, defeating Australia 13–3 in the final.

Teams
The following 11 teams appeared at the tournament.

Round 1

Pool A

Standings

Notes

Schedule

Pool B

Standings

Schedule

Round 2

Pool C

Standings

Schedule

Pool D

Standings

Schedule

Final round

Classification games

9th and 10th place

7th and 8th place

5th and 6th place

Semi-finals

Bronze medal game

Gold medal game

Shooting incident
On August 13, during the game against the Netherlands, Hong Kong player Cheuk Woon-Yee was struck by a stray bullet in the leg. The incident occurred when Cheuk was taking the field to play third base in the fourth inning against the Netherlands, which were leading the game 12–9. The game was held at José Antonio Casanova Stadium in Fort Tiuna, a military garrison in Caracas. The other two games on Friday and all games on Saturday were postponed.

On August 15, the International Baseball Federation and the organizers of the tournament decided to move all remaining games to Maracay. The schedule did not include Hong Kong, as they elected to withdraw from the competition to return home.

Final standings

Awards 
The IBAF announced the following awards at the completion of the tournament.

References

External links 
Official Website

Women's Baseball World Cup
2010 in baseball
2010s in women's baseball
Women's Baseball World Cup, 2010
2010
Maracay
Women's Baseball World Cup, 2010
Women's Baseball World Cup, 2010
Women's Baseball World Cup